"Under the Sun" and "Under the Moon" are songs on the double-A side thirteenth single by Do As Infinity, released in 2002. The second A-side of this single, "Under the Moon", which is an extension song to "Under the Sun", was not included in the True Song album. The song "Under the Sun" was used in games and anime, and included on the Do As Infinity Anime and Game Collection compilation album (2015). Both songs were written by guitarist Dai Nagao who also wrote many of the band's hit songs, including Yō no ataru sakamichi and Shinjitsu no uta. The song "Under the Sun" is sung in Japanese with English phrases. The lyrics begin: "'I walk under the sun 太陽とダンス 変わってく, 予感 いいんじゃない？ (Taiyō to dansu kawatte ku, yokan īn'janai?)".

Track listing
"Under the Sun"
"Under the Moon"
"Under the Sun" (Instrumental)
"Under the Moon" (Instrumental)

Chart positions

References

External links
 "Under the Sun / Under the Moon" at Avex Network
 "Under the Sun / Under the Moon" at Oricon

2002 singles
Do As Infinity songs
Songs written by Dai Nagao
2002 songs
Avex Trax singles
Song recordings produced by Seiji Kameda